The 2020 Homecoming was the inaugural Homecoming professional wrestling television special produced by All Elite Wrestling (AEW). The event marked AEW's return to their home base of Daily's Place in Jacksonville, Florida, following the promotion's debut at the venue during Fight for the Fallen. It was held on January 1, 2020, and was broadcast on TNT as a special episode of AEW's weekly television program, Dynamite.

Production

Background
All Elite Wrestling (AEW) was founded in January 2019 and the company held its third-ever event, Fight for the Fallen, on July 13, 2019 at Daily's Place in Jacksonville, Florida. Daily's Place is an open-air amphitheater located on the same complex as the TIAA Bank Field, the home stadium of the Jacksonville Jaguars, a National Football League team that is also owned by AEW President and Chief Executive Officer Tony Khan. As such, the stadium itself is AEW's de facto headquarters, with Daily's Place becoming AEW's home base. In October, AEW announced that they would be holding a special episode of their weekly television program, Dynamite, on January 1, 2020 at Daily's Place, and it would be titled Homecoming as a reference to the venue.

Storylines
Homecoming featured five professional wrestling matches that involved different wrestlers from pre-existing scripted feuds and storylines. Wrestlers portrayed heroes, villains, or less distinguishable characters in scripted events that built tension and culminated in a wrestling match or series of matches. Storylines were produced on AEW's weekly television program, Dynamite, the supplementary online streaming show, Dark, and The Young Bucks' YouTube series Being The Elite.

Reception

Television ratings
Homecoming averaged 967,000 television viewers on TNT and a 0.36 rating in AEW's key demographic.

Aftermath
Due to the COVID-19 pandemic that began effecting the professional wrestling industry in mid-March 2020, AEW would return to Daily's Place (with the exception of a brief few weeks from late March to April in which some events were taped at a training facility in Norcross, Georgia). These events were originally held without fans, but the company began running shows at 10–15% capacity in August, before eventually running full capacity shows in May 2021. In early July 2021, AEW scheduled a second Homecoming episode to be held after the conclusion of the "Welcome Back" tour, which celebrated the promotion's return to live touring. The event will briefly return AEW to Daily's Place on August 4 and is being promoted as the final event to be held at Daily's Place for Summer 2021. The shows held at Daily's Place during the pandemic are not considered Homecoming shows due to the circumstances.

Results

See also
2020 in professional wrestling

References

External links

2020
2020s American television specials
2020 American television episodes
2020 in professional wrestling in Florida
2020 in professional wrestling
Events in Jacksonville, Florida
January 2020 events in the United States
Professional wrestling in Jacksonville, Florida